Fernando "Nando" Seler Parrado Dolgay (born 9 December 1949) is one of the sixteen Uruguayan survivors of Uruguayan Air Force Flight 571, which crashed in the Andes mountains on 13 October 1972. After spending two months trapped in the mountains with the other crash survivors, he, along with Roberto Canessa, climbed through the Andes mountains over a 10-day period to find help. His efforts, supported in various ways by the entire group, have been recognized through books and other media. He was portrayed by Ethan Hawke in the 1993 feature film Alive.

Background
Parrado was born in Montevideo, Uruguay, to Seler Parrado and Eugenia Dolgay, the second of three children, with an older sister, Graciela, and a younger sister, Susana or "Susy.” He graduated from the Stella Maris College and played for their alumni rugby team, Old Christians.

At the time of the Andes crash, he was a university student. In his 2006 book, Miracle in the Andes: 72 Days on the Mountain and My Long Trek Home, Parrado described his life in the days immediately prior to the Andes:

Parrado also states in Miracle in the Andes that after he returned from the mountains, he gave up his studies. Still coping with the loss of his sister, Susy, and their mother, both victims of the same plane crash, Parrado drifted for a period of time. Initially, Parrado helped out in his father's business, though he was interested in the field of sports car racing and for many years developed a career as a professional race car driver. After his marriage, he gave up professional racing and took over his father's hardware business alongside his older sister and brother-in-law. He also developed additional businesses and became a television personality in Uruguay. In 2020 a racehorse named after Parrado won the Coventry Stakes at the Royal Ascot meeting. Parrado has given his consent for the horse to be named after him.

Conferences
In addition to his work in business and television, Parrado is a motivational speaker, using his experience in the Andes to help others cope with psychological trauma.

Miracle in the Andes
Parrado co-wrote the 2006 book Miracle in the Andes: 72 Days on the Mountain and My Long Trek Home, with Vince Rause. The book references Piers Paul Read's account of the accident and aftermath, Alive: The Story of the Andes Survivors, which was written two years after the rescue (and based upon interviews with the survivors). Miracle in the Andes, however, is told from Parrado's point of view 34 years later.

Filmography

See also
 Roberto Canessa
 Carlos Páez Rodríguez

References

External links

Official website
GDA Speakers profile

1949 births
Living people
Uruguayan motivational speakers
Rugby union players from Montevideo
Survivors of aviation accidents or incidents
Uruguayan Air Force Flight 571
Uruguayan businesspeople
Uruguayan Roman Catholics
Uruguayan rugby union players
Uruguayan people of Spanish descent
Uruguayan autobiographers
People educated at Stella Maris College (Montevideo)